Amiyah may refer to:

 Amaya (disambiguation)